Victoria City was one of the first twelve provincial electoral districts in the province of British Columbia, Canada, upon its entry into Confederation that year.  It was originally a four-member riding, and elected to the Legislature several prominent members of the Legislative Assembly (MLAs) and premiers.  It last appeared on the hustings in the 1963 election.

Electoral history 
Note:  Winners in each election are in bold.

|-

|Independent
|Robert Beaven 
|align="right"|301
|align="right"|19.87%
|align="right"|
|align="right"|unknown

|Independent
|Simeon Duck 
|align="right"|301
|align="right"|19.87%
|align="right"|
|align="right"|unknown

|Independent
|John Foster McCreight1 
|align="right"|373
|align="right"|24.62%
|align="right"|
|align="right"|unknown

|Independent
|James Trimble
|align="right"|321
|align="right"|21.19%
|align="right"|
|align="right"|unknown

|Independent
|Robert Taylor Williams
|align="right"|124
|align="right"|8.18%
|align="right"|
|align="right"|unknown
|- bgcolor="white"
!align="right" colspan=3|Total valid votes
!align="right"|1,515
!align="right"|100.00%
!align="right"|
!align="right"|
|- bgcolor="white"
!align="right" colspan=3|Total rejected ballots
!align="right"|
!align="right"|
!align="right"|
!align="right"|
|- bgcolor="white"
!align="right" colspan=3|Turnout
!align="right"|%
!align="right"|
!align="right"|
!align="right"|
|- bgcolor="white"
!align="right" colspan=7|1<small>  First Premier of British Columbia.
|}

|-

|Independent
|Robert Beaven
|align="right"|Acclaimed
|align="right"| -.- %
|align="right"|
|align="right"|unknown
|- bgcolor="white"
!align="right" colspan=3|Total valid votes
!align="right"|n/a
!align="right"| -.- %
!align="right"|
|- bgcolor="white"
!align="right" colspan=3|Total rejected ballots
!align="right"|
!align="right"|
!align="right"|
|- bgcolor="white"
!align="right" colspan=3|Turnout
!align="right"|%
!align="right"|
!align="right"|
|- bgcolor="white"
!align="right" colspan=7|²  <small>The byelection was called due to Beaven's resignation upon appointment to the Executive Council (cabinet) on December 23, 1872.  This byelection was one of a series held to confirm appointments to the Executive Council, which was the old parliamentary convention.  As this byelection writ was filled by acclamation, no polling day was required and the seat was filled within two weeks.  The stated date is the date the return of writs was received by the Chief Electoral Officer.
|}

|-

|Independent
|Simeon Duck
|align="right"|368
|align="right"|13.09%
|align="right"|
|align="right"|unknown

|- bgcolor="white"
!align="right" colspan=3|Total valid votes
!align="right"|2,811
!align="right"|100.00%
!align="right"|
|- bgcolor="white"
!align="right" colspan=3|Total rejected ballots
!align="right"|
!align="right"|
!align="right"|
|- bgcolor="white"
!align="right" colspan=3|Turnout
!align="right"|%
!align="right"|
!align="right"|
|- bgcolor="white"
!align="right" colspan=7|6<small> Sixth Premier of British Columbia.
|}

|-

|Independent (?)
|Joseph Westrop Carey
|align="right"|543
|align="right"|1.34%
|align="right"|
|align="right"|unknown

 
|Labour
|John Mayfield Duval
|align="right"|127
|align="right"|3.21%
|align="right"|
|align="right"|unknown

|Labour
|Andrew Johnston Smith
|align="right"|208
|align="right"|5.26%
|align="right"|
|align="right"|unknown

|Independent
|Charles Wilson
|align="right"|570
|align="right"|7.94%
|align="right"|
|align="right"|unknown
|- bgcolor="white"
!align="right" colspan=3|Total valid votes
!align="right"|7,179
!align="right"|100.00%
!align="right"|
|- bgcolor="white"
!align="right" colspan=3|Total rejected ballots
!align="right"|
!align="right"|
!align="right"|
|- bgcolor="white"
!align="right" colspan=3|Turnout
!align="right"|%
!align="right"|
!align="right"|
|}

|Labour
|James Stuart Yates 
|align="right"|1,233 	
|align="right"|10.95%
|align="right"|
|align="right"|unknown
|- bgcolor="white"
!align="right" colspan=3|Total valid votes
!align="right"|11,264
!align="right"|100.00%
!align="right"|
|- bgcolor="white"
!align="right" colspan=3|Total rejected ballots
!align="right"|
!align="right"|
!align="right"|
|- bgcolor="white"
!align="right" colspan=3|Turnout
!align="right"|%
!align="right"|
!align="right"|
|- bgcolor="white"
!align="right" colspan=7|11 Thirteenth Premier of British Columbia.
|}

In 1902, premier Edward Gawler Prior won a seat in a by-election.

|Liberal
|William George Cameron
|align="right"|1,860
|align="right"|14.54%
|align="right"|
|align="right"|unknown

|Liberal
|Richard Low Drury
|align="right"|1,744
|align="right"|13.63%
|align="right"|
|align="right"|unknown

|Liberal
|Richard Hall
|align="right"|1,554
|align="right"|12.14%
|align="right"|
|align="right"|unknown
 
|Conservative
|Charles Hayward
|align="right"|1,396
|align="right"|10.91%
|align="right"|
|align="right"|unknown
 
|Conservative
|Henry Dallas Helmcken 
|align="right"|1,342
|align="right"|10.49%
|align="right"|
|align="right"|unknown
 
|Conservative
|Joseph Hunter
|align="right"|1,223
|align="right"|9.56%
|align="right"|
|align="right"|unknown

|Liberal
|James Dugald McNiven 
|align="right"|1,627
|align="right"|12.71%
|align="right"|
|align="right"|unknown
 
|Conservative
|Albert Edward McPhillips
|align="right"|1,352 	
|align="right"|10.57%
|align="right"|
|align="right"|unknown

|- bgcolor="white"
!align="right" colspan=3|Total valid votes
!align="right"|12,795
!align="right"|100.00%
!align="right"|
|- bgcolor="white"
!align="right" colspan=3|Total rejected ballots
!align="right"|
!align="right"|
!align="right"|
|- bgcolor="white"
!align="right" colspan=3|Turnout
!align="right"|%
!align="right"|
!align="right"|
|}

 
|Conservative
|Henry Frederick William Behnsen
|align="right"|1,477
|align="right"|11.77%
|align="right"|
|align="right"|unknown

|Liberal
|William George Cameron
|align="right"|1,164
|align="right"|9.28%
|align="right"|
|align="right"|unknown
 
|Conservative
|Frederick Davey 
|align="right"|1,497
|align="right"|11.93%
|align="right"|
|align="right"|unknown

|Liberal
|Richard Low Drury
|align="right"|1,192
|align="right"|9.50%
|align="right"|
|align="right"|unknown
 
|Canadian Labour Party of BC
|Ernest Amos Hall
|align="right"|863
|align="right"|6.88%
|align="right"|
|align="right"|unknown

|Liberal
|Richard Hall
|align="right"|1,089
|align="right"|8.68%
|align="right"|
|align="right"|unknown
 
|Canadian Labour Party of BC
|Arngrimur Johnson
|align="right"|437
|align="right"|3.47%
|align="right"|
|align="right"|unknown
 
|Canadian Labour Party of BC
|William Herbert Marcon
|align="right"|366
|align="right"|2.92%
|align="right"|
|align="right"|unknown
 
|Conservative
|Richard McBride12 
|align="right"|1,614
|align="right"|12.86%
|align="right"|
|align="right"|unknown
 
|Liberal
|James Dugald McNiven
|align="right"|1,029
|align="right"|8.20%
|align="right"|
|align="right"|unknown
 
|Conservative
|Henry Broughton Thomson 
|align="right"|1,377
|align="right"|10.97%
|align="right"|
|align="right"|unknown

|- bgcolor="white"
!align="right" colspan=3|Total valid votes
!align="right"|12,548
!align="right"|100.00%
!align="right"|
|- bgcolor="white"
!align="right" colspan=3|Total rejected ballots
!align="right"|
!align="right"|
!align="right"|
|- bgcolor="white"
!align="right" colspan=3|Turnout
!align="right"|%
!align="right"|
!align="right"|
|- bgcolor="white"
!align="right" colspan=7|12  Sixteenth Premier of British Columbia.
|}

 
|Conservative
|Henry Frederick William Behnsen
|align="right"|2,497
|align="right"|12.92%
|align="right"|
|align="right"|unknown
 
|Conservative
|Frederick Davey 
|align="right"|2,053
|align="right"|12.96%
|align="right"|
|align="right"|unknown

|Liberal
|Richard Low Drury
|align="right"|2,031
|align="right"|10.51%
|align="right"|
|align="right"|unknown

|Liberal
|William Kyle Houston
|align="right"|1,875
|align="right"|9.71%
|align="right"|
|align="right"|unknown
 
|Conservative
|Richard McBride 
|align="right"|2,846
|align="right"|14.78%
|align="right"|
|align="right"|unknown

|Independent
|Alfred James Morley 13
|align="right"|2,218
|align="right"|11.48%
|align="right"|
|align="right"|unknown

|Liberal
|John Oliver14 
|align="right"|2,216
|align="right"|11.47%
|align="right"|
|align="right"|unknown
 
|Conservative
|Henry Broughton Thomson 
|align="right"|2,465
|align="right"|12.76%
|align="right"|
|align="right"|unknown
|- bgcolor="white"
!align="right" colspan=3|Total valid votes
!align="right"|19,320 
!align="right"|100.00%
!align="right"|
|- bgcolor="white"
!align="right" colspan=3|Total rejected ballots
!align="right"|
!align="right"|
!align="right"|
|- bgcolor="white"
!align="right" colspan=3|Turnout
!align="right"|%
!align="right"|
!align="right"|
|- bgcolor="white"
!align="right" colspan=7|13 <small>Endorsed by Liberals.
|- bgcolor="white"
!align="right" colspan=7|14 <small>Later 19th Premier of BC 1918-1927.
|}

 
|Conservative
|Henry Frederick William Behnsen 
|align="right"|2,392
|align="right"|14.92%
|align="right"|
|align="right"|unknown

|Liberal
|Harlan Carey Brewster
|align="right"|2,049
|align="right"|12.78%
|align="right"|
|align="right"|unknown
 
|Conservative
|Frederick Davey 
|align="right"|2,471
|align="right"|15.41%
|align="right"|
|align="right"|unknown

|Liberal
|Richard Thomas Elliott
|align="right"|1,979
|align="right"|12.34%
|align="right"|
|align="right"|unknown
 
|Conservative
|Richard McBride
|align="right"|3,223
|align="right"|20.10%
|align="right"|
|align="right"|unknown

|Independent
|Bernard Joseph Perry
|align="right"|616
|align="right"|3.84%
|align="right"|
|align="right"|unknown
 
|Conservative
|Henry Broughton Thomson 
|align="right"|2,641
|align="right"|16.47%
|align="right"|
|align="right"|unknown
|- bgcolor="white"
!align="right" colspan=3|Total valid votes
!align="right"|16,034 
!align="right"|100.00%
!align="right"|
|- bgcolor="white"
!align="right" colspan=3|Total rejected ballots
!align="right"|
!align="right"|
!align="right"|
|- bgcolor="white"
!align="right" colspan=3|Turnout
!align="right"|%
!align="right"|
!align="right"|
|- bgcolor="white"
!align="right" colspan=7|15  <small>Endorsed by Social Democratic Party of BC
|}

|Liberal
|George Bell 
|align="right"|3,963
|align="right"|12.89%
|align="right"|
|align="right"|unknown

|Liberal
|Harlan Carey Brewster 
|align="right"|4,988
|align="right"|16.22%
|align="right"|
|align="right"|unknown
 
|Conservative
|John Dilworth
|align="right"|2,651
|align="right"|8.62%
|align="right"|
|align="right"|unknown

|Independent Liberal
|Ernest Amos Hall
|align="right"|1,518
|align="right"|4.94%
|align="right"|
|align="right"|unknown

|Liberal
|Henry Charles Hall 
|align="right"|3,161
|align="right"|10.28%
|align="right"|
|align="right"|unknown

|Liberal
|John Hart 
|align="right"|3,660
|align="right"|11.90%
|align="right"|
|align="right"|unknown
 
|Conservative
|Reginald Hayward
|align="right"|2,793
|align="right"|9.08%
|align="right"|
|align="right"|unknown

|Independent
|Alfred James Morley
|align="right"|1,185
|align="right"|3.85%
|align="right"|
|align="right"|unknown

 
|Conservative
|Alexander Stewart
|align="right"|3,129
|align="right"|10.18%
|align="right"|
|align="right"|unknown
 
|Conservative
|Leonard Tait
|align="right"|2,774
|align="right"|9.02%
|align="right"|
|align="right"|unknown
|- bgcolor="white"
!align="right" colspan=3|Total valid votes
!align="right"|30,751 
!align="right"|100.00%
!align="right"|
|- bgcolor="white"
!align="right" colspan=3|Total rejected ballots
!align="right"|
!align="right"|
!align="right"|
|- bgcolor="white"
!align="right" colspan=3|Turnout
!align="right"|%
!align="right"|
!align="right"|
|}

 
|Liberal
|Joseph Badenoch Clearihue
|align="right"|3,498 	
|align="right"|6.77%
|align="right"|
|align="right"|unknown
 
|Liberal
|Samuel James Drake
|align="right"|3,527 	
|align="right"|6.83%
|align="right"|
|align="right"|unknown

|Canadian Labour Party
|Mary Gertrude Graves
|align="right"|1,056 	
|align="right"|2.04%
|align="right"|
|align="right"|unknown

|Canadian Labour Party
|James Hurst Hawthornthwaite
|align="right"|821 	
|align="right"|1.59%
|align="right"|
|align="right"|unknown
 
|Conservative
|Reginald Hayward 
|align="right"|6,127 	
|align="right"|11.86%
|align="right"|
|align="right"|unknown
 
|Conservative
|Joshua Hinchcliffe 
|align="right"|6,118 	
|align="right"|11.84%
|align="right"|
|align="right"|unknown
 
|Conservative
|Robert Allan Gus Lyons 
|align="right"|5,120	
|align="right"|9.91%
|align="right"|
|align="right"|unknown

|Independent
|Christopher Roland North
|align="right"|1,715 	
|align="right"|3.32%
|align="right"|
|align="right"|unknown
 
|Liberal
|John Oliver
|align="right"|4,032 	
|align="right"|7.80%
|align="right"|
|align="right"|unknown

|Canadian Labour Party
|William Edouard Peirce
|align="right"|763 	
|align="right"|1.48%
|align="right"|
|align="right"|unknown
 
|Liberal
|Melbourne Raynor
|align="right"|4,138 	
|align="right"|8.01%
|align="right"|
|align="right"|unknown

 
|Conservative
|Harold Despard Twigg
|align="right"|5,710 	
|align="right"|11.05%
|align="right"|
|align="right"|unknown

|- bgcolor="white"
!align="right" colspan=3|Total valid votes
!align="right"|51,675 
!align="right"|100.00%
!align="right"|
|- bgcolor="white"
!align="right" colspan=3|Total rejected ballots
!align="right"|
!align="right"|
!align="right"|
|- bgcolor="white"
!align="right" colspan=3|Turnout
!align="right"|%
!align="right"|
!align="right"|
|}

 
|Conservative
|James Harry Beatty 
|align="right"|7,505	
|align="right"|13.06%
|align="right"|
|align="right"|unknown
 
|Liberal
|Robert Alexander C. Dewar
|align="right"|6,180
|align="right"|10.76%
|align="right"|
|align="right"|unknown
 
|Liberal
|Mark Willson Graham
|align="right"|6,025 	
|align="right"|10.49%
|align="right"|
|align="right"|unknown
 
|Conservative
|Reginald Hayward 
|align="right"|7,754 	
|align="right"|13.50%
|align="right"|
|align="right"|unknown
 
|Conservative
|Joshua Hinchcliffe 
|align="right"|7,614 	
|align="right"|13.25%
|align="right"|
|align="right"|unknown

 
|Liberal
|John Duncan MacLean
|align="right"|6,672 	
|align="right"|11.61%

|Independent
|Christopher Rowland North
|align="right"|894 	
|align="right"|1.56%
|align="right"|
|align="right"|unknown
 
|Liberal
|William Thomas Straith
|align="right"|6,201 	
|align="right"|10.79%
|align="right"|
|align="right"|unknown
 
|Conservative
|Harold Despard Twigg 
|align="right"|7,232 	
|align="right"|11.05%
|align="right"|
|align="right"|unknown
|- bgcolor="white"
!align="right" colspan=3|Total valid votes
!align="right"|57,457 
!align="right"|100.00%
!align="right"|
|- bgcolor="white"
!align="right" colspan=3|Total rejected ballots
!align="right"|251
!align="right"|
!align="right"|
|- bgcolor="white"
!align="right" colspan=3|Turnout
!align="right"|%
!align="right"|
!align="right"|
|}

|Independent
|Herbert Anscomb 
|align="right"|5,767 	
|align="right"|8.83%
|align="right"|
|align="right"|unknown

 
|Co-operative Commonwealth Fed.
|William Baxter Caird
|align="right"|2,528 	
|align="right"|3.87%

 
|Liberal
|Joseph Badenoch Clearihue
|align="right"|5,551 	
|align="right"|8.50%
|align="right"|
|align="right"|unknown
 
|Co-operative Commonwealth Fed.
|Robert Connell 
|align="right"|5,607 		
|align="right"|8.58%
|align="right"|
|align="right"|unknown

|Independents
|Clem Davies
|align="right"|5,259 		
|align="right"|8.05%
|align="right"|
|align="right"|unknown

 
|Liberal
|John Hart 
|align="right"|6,133 	
|align="right"|9.39%
|align="right"|
|align="right"|unknown
 
|Conservative
|Reginald Hayward
|align="right"|3,812 	
|align="right"|5.84%
|align="right"|
|align="right"|unknown
 
|Liberal
|Byron Ingemar Johnson 
|align="right"|7,774 	
|align="right"|11.85%
|align="right"|
|align="right"|unknown
 
|Liberal
|William Hamilton Kinsman
|align="right"|4,962 		
|align="right"|7.60%
|align="right"|
|align="right"|unknown

|Independent
|Andrew McGavin
|align="right"|1,054 	
|align="right"|1.61%
|align="right"|
|align="right"|unknown

|Independent
|Agnes Helen Mason
|align="right"|107 		
|align="right"|0.16%
|align="right"|
|align="right"|unknown
 
|Co-operative Commonwealth Fed.
|Victor Rainsford Midgley
|align="right"|2,892 	
|align="right"|4.43%
|align="right"|
|align="right"|unknown

|Independent
|Christopher Rowland North
|align="right"|412 	
|align="right"|0.63%
|align="right"|
|align="right"|unknown
 
|Labour Party
|John Harry Owen
|align="right"|503 	
|align="right"|0.77%
|align="right"|
|align="right"|unknown
 
|Co-operative Commonwealth Fed.
|Thomas Guy Sheppard
|align="right"|4,111 	
|align="right"|6.29%
|align="right"|
|align="right"|unknown

|Independent
|Patrick John Paterson Sinnott
|align="right"|1,557 	
|align="right"|2.38%
|align="right"|
|align="right"|unknown

|Independent
|Robert Taylor Williams
|align="right"|1,257 	 	
|align="right"|1.92%
|align="right"|
|align="right"|unknown
|- bgcolor="white"
!align="right" colspan=3|Total valid votes
!align="right"|65,316 	
!align="right"|100.00%
!align="right"|
|- bgcolor="white"
!align="right" colspan=3|Total rejected ballots
!align="right"|185
!align="right"|
!align="right"|
|- bgcolor="white"
!align="right" colspan=3|Turnout
!align="right"|%
!align="right"|
!align="right"|
|- bgcolor="white"
!align="right" colspan=7|19 In addition to William John Bowser (NPIG), the List of Candidates contains five other candidates who did not run on the amended polling day (see note 2): Charles Randall Bishop (NPIG), Joshua Hinchliffe (UPBC), Walter Luney (NPIG), George McGregor (NPIG) and Lorne Ross (IND.).
|}

 
|Conservative
|Herbert Anscomb
|align="right"|6,927 	
|align="right"|10.50%
|align="right"|
|align="right"|unknown
 
|Co-operative Commonwealth Fed.
|Kathleen Anderson Bell
|align="right"|2,362 	
|align="right"|3.58%
|align="right"|
|align="right"|unknown
 
|Co-operative Commonwealth Fed.
|William Baxter Caird
|align="right"|2,343 		
|align="right"|3.55%
|align="right"|
|align="right"|unknown
 
|BC Constructivist Party
|Robert Connell 
|align="right"|2,540 		
|align="right"|3.85%
|align="right"|
|align="right"|unknown

 
|Liberal
|John Hart 
|align="right"|7,196 	 	
|align="right"|10.91%
|align="right"|
|align="right"|unknown
 
|Liberal
|Nancy Hodges
|align="right"|6,259 	 	
|align="right"|9.49%
|align="right"|
|align="right"|unknown
 
|Conservative
|Joseph Douglas Hunter
|align="right"|6,792 	
|align="right"|10.30%
|align="right"|
|align="right"|unknown
 
|Liberal
|Byron Ingemar Johnson
|align="right"|6,440 	
|align="right"|9.76%
|align="right"|
|align="right"|unknown

 
|Conservative
|Bruce Alistair McKelvie
|align="right"|6,585 	
|align="right"|9.98%
|align="right"|
|align="right"|unknown

 
|Co-operative Commonwealth Fed.
|Nigel Morgan
|align="right"|2,536 	
|align="right"|3.85%
|align="right"|
|align="right"|unknown
 
|Liberal
|William Thomas Straith 
|align="right"|6,676 	
|align="right"|10.12%
|align="right"|
|align="right"|unknown
 
|Co-operative Commonwealth Fed.
|James Johnstone Walker
|align="right"|2,357 	
|align="right"|3.57%
|align="right"|
|align="right"|unknown

 
|Conservative
|Frederick Arthur Willis
|align="right"|5,270 	
|align="right"|7.99%
|align="right"|
|align="right"|unknown
|- bgcolor="white"
!align="right" colspan=3|Total valid votes
!align="right"|65,955	
!align="right"|100.00%
!align="right"|
|- bgcolor="white"
!align="right" colspan=3|Total rejected ballots
!align="right"|233
!align="right"|
!align="right"|
|- bgcolor="white"
!align="right" colspan=3|Turnout
!align="right"|%
!align="right"|
!align="right"|
|}

 
|Co-operative Commonwealth Fed.
|William Baxter Caird
|align="right"|3,358 		
|align="right"|7.72%
|align="right"|
|align="right"|unknown
 
|Liberal
|John Hart 
|align="right"|6,637 	
|align="right"|15.26%
|align="right"|
|align="right"|unknown
 
|Liberal
|Nancy Hodges 
|align="right"|5,854 	 	
|align="right"|13.46%
|align="right"|
|align="right"|unknown
 
|Conservative
|Joseph Douglas Hunter
|align="right"|5,220 		
|align="right"|12.00%
|align="right"|
|align="right"|unknown

 
|Co-operative Commonwealth Fed.
|Clare Nulalinda McAllister
|align="right"|3,380 	
|align="right"|7.77%
|align="right"|
|align="right"|unknown
 
|Conservative
|Duncan Douglas McTavish
|align="right"|4,657 	
|align="right"|10.71%
|align="right"|
|align="right"|unknown
 
|Co-operative Commonwealth Fed.
|Harold Oscar Simpson
|align="right"|2,998 	
|align="right"|6.89%
|align="right"|
|align="right"|unknown
 
|Conservative
|Waldo McTavish Skillings
|align="right"|4,150 	
|align="right"|9.54%
|align="right"|
|align="right"|unknown
 
|Liberal
|William Thomas Straith 
|align="right"|6,280 	
|align="right"|14.44%
|align="right"|
|align="right"|unknown
|- bgcolor="white"
!align="right" colspan=3|Total valid votes
!align="right"|43,497 
!align="right"|100.00%
!align="right"|
|- bgcolor="white"
!align="right" colspan=3|Total rejected ballots
!align="right"|131
!align="right"|
!align="right"|
|- bgcolor="white"
!align="right" colspan=3|Turnout
!align="right"|%
!align="right"|
!align="right"|
|- bgcolor="white"
!align="right" colspan=7|20  Seat reduced from four members to three.
|}

 
|Co-operative Commonwealth Fed.
|Frederick James Bevis
|align="right"|5,288 		
|align="right"|10.56%
|align="right"|
|align="right"|unknown
 
|Co-operative Commonwealth Fed.
|Murray D. Bryce
|align="right"|6,485		
|align="right"|12.95%
|align="right"|
|align="right"|unknown
 
|Co-operative Commonwealth Fed.
|May Campbell
|align="right"|5,093 	
|align="right"|10.17%
|align="right"|
|align="right"|unknown
 
|Independent Progressive Conservative
|Ellen Hart
|align="right"|473 	
|align="right"|0.94%

 
|Labour Progressive Party
|Robert Joseph Kerr
|align="right"|436 	
|align="right"|0.87%

|- bgcolor="white"
!align="right" colspan=3|Total valid votes
!align="right"|50,071 	 
!align="right"|100.00%
!align="right"|
|- bgcolor="white"
!align="right" colspan=3|Total rejected ballots
!align="right"|124

 
|Co-operative Commonwealth Fed.
|May Campbell
|align="right"|5,809 		
|align="right"|8.84%

 
|Co-operative Commonwealth Fed.
|Violet J. Rayment
|align="right"|5,310 	
|align="right"|8.08%

 
|Co-operative Commonwealth Fed.
|Phyllis Jean Webb
|align="right"|5,900 	
|align="right"|9.00%
|- bgcolor="white"
!align="right" colspan=3|Total valid votes
!align="right"|65,679
|- bgcolor="white"
!align="right" colspan=3|Total rejected ballots
!align="right"|253
|}

|Co-operative Commonwealth Fed.
|William Baxter Caird
|align="right"|6,008 	 		
|align="right"|25.21%
|align="right"|8,421  
|align="right"|41.09%
|align="right"|
|align="right"|unknown

|Independent
|Phillip Bernard Freedman
|align="right"|137 	 		       
|align="right"|0.57% 
|align="right"| -  
|align="right"| -.- %
|align="right"|
|align="right"|unknown

|Progressive Conservative
|Lillian Margaret Harvey
|align="right"|4,362 	       
|align="right"|18.30% 
|align="right"| -  
|align="right"| -.- %
|align="right"|
|align="right"|unknown

|Liberal
|Nancy Hodges
|align="right"|8,805 	 	 	    
|align="right"|36.95%  
|align="right"|12,071
|align="right"|58.91% 
|align="right"|
|align="right"|unknown
|- bgcolor="white"
!align="right" colspan=3|Total valid votes
!align="right"|23,830 	  	 	             
!align="right"|100.00%
!align="right"|20,492
!align="right"|%
!align="right"|
|- bgcolor="white"
!align="right" colspan=3|Total rejected ballots
!align="right"|1,991
!align="right"|
!align="right"|
|- bgcolor="white"
!align="right" colspan=3|Turnout
!align="right"|77.94%
!align="right"|
!align="right"|
|- bgcolor="white"
!align="right" colspan=9|21 <small>Candidate choices in multi-member ridings such as Victoria City were split into separate ballot competitions for the elimination ballot.  Victoria City ran three fields of candidates, arranged in Ballots A, B, and C.  Preferential ballot; first and final counts (of 4) shown only.
|}

|-

|Co-operative Commonwealth Fed.
|Colin Cameron 
|align="right"|6,329 	 	 	     
|align="right"|27.08% 
|align="right"|8,902  
|align="right"|44.60%
|align="right"|
|align="right"|unknown

|Progressive Conservative
|Albert DeBurgo McPhillips
|align="right"|4,608 	
|align="right"|19.72%
|align="right"| -  
|align="right"| -.- %
|align="right"|
|align="right"|unknown

|Liberal
|Daniel John Proudfoot
|align="right"|7,842 	 	 	    
|align="right"|33.56%  
|align="right"|11,057
|align="right"|55.40% 
|align="right"|
|align="right"|unknown

|Independent
|William Alfred Scott
|align="right"|226 	 	        
|align="right"|0.97% 
|align="right"|-
|align="right"|-% 
|align="right"|
|align="right"|unknown
|- bgcolor="white"
!align="right" colspan=3|Total valid votes
!align="right"|23,370 	  	 	            
!align="right"|100.00%
!align="right"|19,959
!align="right"|%
!align="right"|
|- bgcolor="white"
!align="right" colspan=3|Total rejected ballots
!align="right"|2,424
!align="right"|
!align="right"|
|- bgcolor="white"
!align="right" colspan=3|Turnout
!align="right"|77.94%
!align="right"|
!align="right"|
|- bgcolor="white"
!align="right" colspan=9|22  <small>Preferential ballot; first and final counts (of 4) shown only.
|}

|-

|Co-operative Commonwealth Fed.
|May Campbell
|align="right"|5,975 	 	 	     
|align="right"|25.24% 
|align="right"|8,511  
|align="right"|41.98%
|align="right"|
|align="right"|unknown

|Progressive Conservative
|Walter Sabiston Miles
|align="right"|4,601 	   
|align="right"|19.44%
|align="right"| - 
|align="right"| -.- %
|align="right"|
|align="right"|unknown

|Liberal
|William Thomas Straith
|align="right"|8,457 	 	 	     
|align="right"|35.73%  
|align="right"|11,762
|align="right"|58.02% 
|align="right"|
|align="right"|unknown
|- bgcolor="white"
!align="right" colspan=3|Total valid votes
!align="right"|23,670 	  	        
!align="right"|100.00%
!align="right"|20,273    
!align="right"|%
!align="right"|
|- bgcolor="white"
!align="right" colspan=3|Total rejected ballots
!align="right"|2,129
!align="right"|
!align="right"|
|- bgcolor="white"
!align="right" colspan=3|Turnout
!align="right"|77.94%
!align="right"|
!align="right"|
|- bgcolor="white"
!align="right" colspan=9|23 <small>Preferential ballot; first and final counts only (of 3) shown.
|}

|-

|Co-operative Commonwealth Fed.
|Thomas Victor Allen	 	 	
|align="right"|4,881 	       
|align="right"|21.42% 
|align="right"|1 -   
|align="right"| -.- %
|align="right"|
|align="right"|unknown

|Progressive Conservative
|Arthur St. Clair Chapman
|align="right"|1,227 	 	 	
|align="right"|5.38%
|align="right"|-  
|align="right"|-%
|align="right"|
|align="right"|unknown

|Independent
|Claude Lionel Harrison
|align="right"|1,022 	 	 	 	     
|align="right"|4.49% 
|align="right"| - 
|align="right"| -.- % 
|align="right"|
|align="right"|unknown

|Liberal
|Nancy Hodges 
|align="right"|6,915 	 	 		 	 	     
|align="right"|30.35% 
|align="right"|8,869
|align="right"|47.01% 
|align="right"|
|align="right"|unknown
|- bgcolor="white"
!align="right" colspan=3|Total valid votes
!align="right"|22,787 	  	 	  	       
!align="right"|100.00%
!align="right"|18,868  
!align="right"|%
!align="right"|
|- bgcolor="white"
!align="right" colspan=3|Total rejected ballots
!align="right"|1,804
!align="right"|
!align="right"|
!align="right"|
!align="right"|
|- bgcolor="white"
!align="right" colspan=3|Total Registered Voters
!align="right"|
!align="right"|
!align="right"|
!align="right"|
!align="right"|
|- bgcolor="white"
!align="right" colspan=3|Turnout
!align="right"|%
!align="right"|
!align="right"|
!align="right"|
!align="right"|
|- bgcolor="white"
!align="right" colspan=7|24  <small>See Note on 1952 Election Ballot A.  Preferential ballot; first and final counts (of 5) shown only.
|}

|-

|Co-operative Commonwealth Fed.
|Colin Cameron  	
|align="right"|5,267 	       
|align="right"|23.50% 
|align="right"| -   
|align="right"| -.- %
|align="right"|
|align="right"|unknown

|Liberal
|Daniel John Proudfoot 
|align="right"|6,484 	 	 	 	 	     
|align="right"|28.92% 
|align="right"|8,344
|align="right"|44.68% 
|align="right"|
|align="right"|unknown

|Progressive Conservative
|Montague Laurence Tyrwhitt-Drake 26
|align="right"|1,383 	 	 	
|align="right"|6.17%
|align="right"|-  
|align="right"|-%
|align="right"|
|align="right"|unknown
|- bgcolor="white"
!align="right" colspan=3|Total valid votes
!align="right"|22,418 	  	 	       
!align="right"|100.00%
!align="right"|18,674    
!align="right"|%
!align="right"|
|- bgcolor="white"
!align="right" colspan=3|Total rejected ballots
!align="right"|2,162
!align="right"|
!align="right"|
!align="right"|
!align="right"|
|- bgcolor="white"
!align="right" colspan=3|Total Registered Voters
!align="right"|
!align="right"|
!align="right"|
!align="right"|
!align="right"|
|- bgcolor="white"
!align="right" colspan=3|Turnout
!align="right"|%
!align="right"|
!align="right"|
!align="right"|
!align="right"|
|- bgcolor="white"
!align="right" colspan=7|25  <small>Preferential ballot; final count is between top two candidates from first count; intermediary counts (of 4) not shown
|- bgcolor="white"
!align="right" colspan=7|26  <small>Listed as "Drake, Montagne Lawrence Tyrwhitt" in Statement of Votes. In 1956 Statement of Votes he was listed as Tyrwhitt-Drake.
|}  	

|-

|Co-operative Commonwealth Fed.
|May Campbell	 	 	
|align="right"|4,923 	        
|align="right"|21.96% 
|align="right"| -   
|align="right"| -.- %
|align="right"|
|align="right"|unknown

|Progressive Conservative
|Robert James Patch
|align="right"|1,139 	 	 	
|align="right"|5.08%
|align="right"|-  
|align="right"|-%
|align="right"|
|align="right"|unknown

|Liberal
|William Thomas Straith 
|align="right"|7,193 		 		 	 	     
|align="right"|32.09% 
|align="right"|8,907
|align="right"|46.90% 
|align="right"|
|align="right"|unknown

|- bgcolor="white"
!align="right" colspan=3|Total valid votes
!align="right"|22,414 	  	 	       
!align="right"|100.00%
!align="right"|18,991   
!align="right"|%
!align="right"|
|- bgcolor="white"
!align="right" colspan=3|Total rejected ballots
!align="right"|2,173
!align="right"|
!align="right"|
!align="right"|
!align="right"|
|- bgcolor="white"
!align="right" colspan=3|Total Registered Voters
!align="right"|
!align="right"|
!align="right"|
!align="right"|
!align="right"|
|- bgcolor="white"
!align="right" colspan=3|Turnout
!align="right"|%
!align="right"|
!align="right"|
!align="right"|
!align="right"|
|- bgcolor="white"
!align="right"|
!align="right" colspan=7|27 <small>Preferential ballot; first and final counts (of 4) not shown
|}

 
|Labour Progressive Party
|Myrtle Woodward Bergren
|align="right"|124 	
|align="right"|0.08%
|align="right"|
|align="right"|unknown
 
|Labour Progressive Party
|Doris Winifred Blakey
|align="right"|143 	
|align="right"|1.10%
|align="right"|
|align="right"|unknown
 
|Co-operative Commonwealth
|William Baxter Caird
|align="right"|3,417 	 	
|align="right"|2.19%
|align="right"|
|align="right"|unknown
 
|Co-operative Commonwealth
|May Campbell
|align="right"|3,432 	 	
|align="right"|5.67%
|align="right"|
|align="right"|unknown

 
|Liberal
|Geoffrey Innes Edgelow
|align="right"|7,241 	
|align="right"|11.96%
|align="right"|unknown
 
|Liberal
|George Frederick Thompson Gregory 
|align="right"|8,408 	
|align="right"|13.89%
|align="right"|
|align="right"|unknown
 
|Co-operative Commonwealth
|Neil Johnson MacGregor Hindle
|align="right"|3,265 	
|align="right"|5.39%
|align="right"|
|align="right"|unknown
 
|Labour Progressive Party
|Ernest Leon Knott
|align="right"|162 		
|align="right"|0.27%
|align="right"|
|align="right"|unknown
 
|Liberal
|Forrest Linden Shaw
|align="right"|7,205 	 	
|align="right"|11.91%
|align="right"|
|align="right"|unknown

 
|Progressive Conservative
|Montague Lawrence Tyrwhitt-Drake
|align="right"|1,476 			 	
|align="right"|2.44%
|align="right"|
|align="right"|unknown
|- bgcolor="white"
!align="right" colspan=3|Total valid votes
!align="right"|60,519 	
!align="right"|100.00%
!align="right"|
|- bgcolor="white"
!align="right" colspan=3|Total rejected ballots
!align="right"|212
!align="right"|
!align="right"|
|- bgcolor="white"
!align="right" colspan=3|Turnout
!align="right"|%
!align="right"|
!align="right"|
|}

 
|Progressive Conservative
|Clive D. Campbell
|align="right"|1,959 			
|align="right"|3.00%
|align="right"|
|align="right"|unknown
 
|CCF
|May Campbell
|align="right"|4,598 	 	 	
|align="right"|7.04%
|align="right"|
|align="right"|unknown

 
|Progressive Conservative
|Theodore H. Cressy
|align="right"|1,543 	
|align="right"|2.36%
|align="right"|
|align="right"|unknown
 
|Liberal
|Geoffrey Innes Edgelow
|align="right"|6,083 	
|align="right"|9.31%
|align="right"|unknown
 
|CCF
|Rhoda Erickson
|align="right"|4,262 	
|align="right"|6.52%
|align="right"|
|align="right"|unknown
 
|Liberal
|George Frederick Thompson Gregory
|align="right"|7,278 	
|align="right"|11.14%
|align="right"|
|align="right"|unknown
 
|CCF
|Neil John MacGregor Hindle
|align="right"|4,516 	
|align="right"|6.91%
|align="right"|
|align="right"|unknown
 
|Liberal
|George Frederick Thompson Gregory 
|align="right"|8,408 	
|align="right"|13.89%
|align="right"|
|align="right"|unknown
 
|Progressive Conservative
|Charles A.P. Murison
|align="right"|2,236 	
|align="right"|3.42%
|align="right"|
|align="right"|unknown
 
|Liberal
|Forrest Linden Shaw
|align="right"|5,464 	
|align="right"|8.36%
|align="right"|
|align="right"|unknown

|- bgcolor="white"
!align="right" colspan=3|Total valid votes
!align="right"|65,329
!align="right"|100.00%
!align="right"|
|- bgcolor="white"
!align="right" colspan=3|Total rejected ballots
!align="right"|388
!align="right"|
!align="right"|
|- bgcolor="white"
!align="right" colspan=3|Turnout
!align="right"|%
!align="right"|
!align="right"|
|}

 
|Progressive Conservative
|Theodore H. Cressy
|align="right"|2,282 	
|align="right"|1.27%
|align="right"|
|align="right"|unknown

 
|Liberal
|Elizabeth Forbes
|align="right"|4,355 	
|align="right"|2.43%
|align="right"|
|align="right"|unknown
 
|Progressive Conservative
|William Charles Gelling
|align="right"|2,528 	
|align="right"|1.41%
|align="right"|unknown
 
|Liberal
|Michael Griffin
|align="right"|4,440 		
|align="right"|7.57%
|align="right"|
|align="right"|unknown
 
|Liberal
|Bruce Humber
|align="right"|4,302 	
|align="right"|7.33%
|align="right"|
|align="right"|unknown

 
|Progressive Conservative
|John Wilberforce Loader
|align="right"|2,253 	
|align="right"|3.84%
|align="right"|
|align="right"|unknown

|- bgcolor="white"
!align="right" colspan=3|Total valid votes
!align="right"|58,670
!align="right"|100.00%
!align="right"|
|- bgcolor="white"
!align="right" colspan=3|Total rejected ballots
!align="right"|175
!align="right"|
!align="right"|
|- bgcolor="white"
!align="right" colspan=3|Turnout
!align="right"|%
!align="right"|
!align="right"|
|}

Sources 

Elections BC Historical Returns

Former provincial electoral districts of British Columbia on Vancouver Island